

Z

References

Lists of words